Toma Ovici (born 31 or 13 May 1949) to Jewish Holocaust survivors in Tirgu Mures, Romania. He is a  right-handed former Romanian tennis player. His highest ATP ranking was number 133, achieved on August 9, 1974.  At the end of 1973, finished ranked 53 in the Commercial Union Grand Prix Table. Twice Romanian Singles Champion in 1973 and 1975 respectively.

Best results in ATP Tournaments, Quarterfinals in Buenos Aires, 1973 1973 South American Open – Singles

and Dusseldorf 1975 https://www.atptour.com/en/scores/archive/dusseldorf/661/1975/draws?matchtype=singles

Davis Cup Record in Singles Matches, 5 Wins and 9 Losses

Best Result in Davis Cup, semifinal in 1973 1973 Davis Cup Main Draw

References

External links
 
 

1949 births
Romanian male tennis players
Living people
Sportspeople from Târgu Mureș